"Evolution No. 9" is the 14th single by the Japanese girl idol group 9nine,  released in Japan on June 12, 2013, on the label SME Records (a subsidiary of Sony Music Entertainment Japan).

The physical CD single debuted at number 11 in the Oricon weekly singles chart.

Background 
The single was released in three versions: Limited Edition A, Limited Edition B, and a regular edition. The limited edition A included a bonus DVD with the music video for the title track, while the limited edition B included a bonus 12-page booklet. Each edition had a different cover.

Track listing

Charts

References

External links 
  (The video is available only in Japan.)
 Limited Edition A at Sony Music

2013 singles
Japanese-language songs
9nine songs
2013 songs
SME Records singles
Song articles with missing songwriters